The Pennsylvania Railroad's class P5 comprised 92 mixed-traffic electric locomotives constructed 1931–1935 by the PRR, Westinghouse and General Electric. Although the original intention was that they work many passenger trains, the success of the GG1 locomotives meant that the P5 class were mostly used on freight. A single survivor, prototype #4700, is at the National Museum of Transportation in St Louis, Missouri.

They had an AAR wheel arrangement of 2-C-2, or 2′ in the UIC classification system — three pairs of driven wheels rigidly mounted to the locomotive, with a two-axle unpowered truck at each end. This is an equivalent to a 4-6-4 in the Whyte notation. The PRR did not have any 4-6-4 steam locomotives, so the P5s were the only 4-6-4 type locomotives owned by the PRR.

The first P5s were built with box cabs.

When the GG1s were put in passenger service, the P5s were regeared and used in freight service for many years.  The last of the class was withdrawn from service in April 1965.


P5 prototypes

Two prototype locomotives were outshopped from the PRR's Altoona Works in 1931.  They were essentially the PRR's 2-B-2 O1 design lengthened by adding another pair of driving wheels; while the O1 was an "electric Atlantic" equivalent to the E6s steam locomotive, the P5 was an "electric Pacific" designed to match or better the performance of the PRR's ubiquitous K4s Pacifics.

These prototypes had electrical equipment from both Westinghouse and General Electric; the design was by both companies and the PRR's electrical department, and the equipment from each manufacturer was identical.

P5a production locomotives

Orders were placed for 90 production locomotives classified P5a due to minor changes from the prototypes (notably, larger traction motor blowers).  Production was split between General Electric and Westinghouse; the GE examples were assembled at GE's Erie, Pennsylvania facility, still a locomotive assembly plant today, while final assembly for the Westinghouse order was subcontracted to the Baldwin Locomotive Works.

P5a (modified) steeplecabs

A fatal grade crossing accident on the New York Division confirmed traincrews' concerns about safety when the crew were killed after colliding with a truckload of apples.  A redesign was undertaken, giving the locomotives a central cab, raised higher, with narrower-topped, streamlined "noses" to the locomotive to enable the crew to see forward.  The final 28 locomotives were built to this design, which was not given a separate class designation since it was mechanically and electrically identical; they were called class P5a (modified), and colloquially Modifieds.

Documentation published in 2010 disproved the decades long belief that the modified P5's new shell design came first and was then applied to the GG1, R1, and eventually the DD2. Instead, it was revealed that the GG1 project, under the direction of industrial designer Donald R. Dohner, was the first to receive the center cab design, and that soon afterward it was applied to the R1 and P5.

The Modified units (along with the R1 and prototype GG1) were built with riveted carbodies. However, unit #4770, rebuilt to a Modified appearance in January 1945 after being wrecked in February 1944, differed from previous Modifieds in having an all-welded carbody, the type of construction famously utilized in the production run of the GG1.

P5b experiment

In October 1937, P5a #4702 was rebuilt with motors in its trucks to become the only locomotive in subclass P5b. The main drivers had used  on each axle, but the trucks were a single motor per axle. This modification also meant that locomotive's entire weight was carried on driven wheels. Despite these advantages the experiment was not repeated, however #4702 continued in its modified form. 

Visually, the class P5b could be distinguished from a boxcab P5a by having a lower row of ventilation grilles on the sides of the superstructure, and by having outside brake cylinders on the trucks.

See also
 PRR locomotive classification

References

Baldwin locomotives
General Electric locomotives
P5
11 kV AC locomotives
4-6-4 locomotives
Westinghouse locomotives
Electric locomotives of the United States
Railway locomotives introduced in 1931
Standard gauge locomotives of the United States